Callin is a surname. Notable people with the surname include:

Arnold Callin (1924–2015), Manx politician
Grant Callin (born 1941), American writer

See also
Calvin (surname)